Shangri-La Colombo is a 5-star hotel in Colombo, Sri Lanka. Owned by Shangri-La Hotels, the property is part of the larger One Galle Face development project at the site of the Old Army Headquarters. It is the second Shangri-La hotel on the island (after Shangri-La's Hambantota Golf Resort & Spa) and the 101st hotel of the chain of Shangri-La Hotels world-wide. The hotel was opened on 11 November 2017. The property has 500 rooms, and has room to accommodate up to 2,000 conference guests.

2019 Easter Sunday bombings 

The Shangri-La was one of three sites of the 2019 Sri Lanka Easter bombings along with the Kingsbury and Cinnamon Grand Colombo. Sri Lankan celebrity chef Shantha Mayadunne and her daughter were among the fatalities. Sri Lankan cricketer Hasitha Boyagoda was having breakfast in the hotel when the bombing took place. He escaped with only minor injuries. Three of the four children of Danish billionaire Anders Holch Povlsen were killed in the attack.

References

2017 establishments in Sri Lanka
Apartment buildings in Colombo
Hotels established in 2017
Hotels in Colombo
Shangri-La Hotels and Resorts
2019 Sri Lanka Easter bombings